The Eighth Happiness (八星報喜) is a 1988 Hong Kong comedy film directed by Johnnie To and starring an ensemble cast of Chow Yun-fat, Raymond Wong, Jacky Cheung, Carol Cheng, Cherie Chung, Fung Bo Bo and Fennie Yuen. It was the highest-grossing film in Hong Kong at the time. The film centers around three brothers Fong Kim-long (Chow Yun-fat), Fong Kim-fai (Raymond Wong Pak-ming) and Fong Kim-sang (Jacky Cheung). One day, their telephone line failed, they meet their future wife because of this incident.

Cast 

 Chow Yun-fat as 'Handsome' Fong Kim-long
 Raymond Wong as Fong Kim-Fai
 Jacky Cheung as Fong Kim-sang
 Carol Cheng as DoDo
 Fennie Yuen as Ying-ying
 Cherie Chung as Beautiful
 Michael Chow as Ying-ying's boyfriend
 Lawrence Cheng as Beautiful's boyfriend
 Charlie Cho as DoDo's prospective suitor
 Fung Bo Bo as Ng Fan-fong
 Teddy Robin as Fan-fong's husband 
 Wong Kwan-yuen as Ming-ming
 Cheng Mang-ha as Old woman driver
Ying Sau Hui as Old man driver
Ringo Lam as Audience member (cameo)
 Karl Maka as Audience member (cameo)
 John Shum as Audience member (cameo)

Box office
The film grossed HK$37,090,776 at the Hong Kong box office during its theatrical run from 11 February to 30 March 1988 and was the top-grossing film of 1988 in Hong Kong and the highest-grossing film in Hong Kong at the time.

References

External links
 

 HK cinemagic entry
 loveHKfilm entry

1988 films
1988 comedy films
Hong Kong comedy films
1980s Cantonese-language films
Films directed by Johnnie To
Films set in Hong Kong
Films shot in Hong Kong
Chinese New Year films
1980s Hong Kong films